Arrows is the third studio album by the alternative rock band The Lonely Forest. The album was released on March 22, 2011 on Trans Records.

Track listing 

Be Everything 
Turn Off This Song and Go Outside 
(I Am) the Love Skeptic 
(I Am) the Love Addict 
Coyote 
I Don't Want To Live There 
Tunnels 
Two Notes and a Beat 
End It Now! 
Woe is Me... I Am Ruined 
We Sing In Time 
Arrows

Accolades

References 

2011 albums
The Lonely Forest albums